Acraga hoppiana is a moth of the family Dalceridae. It is found in Colombia and Ecuador. The habitat consists of tropical wet, Tropical lower montane dry and possibly in tropical premontane rain forests.

The length of the forewings is 9–10 mm. The forewings are yellow and the hindwings are whitish. Adults are on wing in July and August.

Etymology
The species is named for the Hopp brothers who collected and studied Dalceridae species.

References

Dalceridae
Moths described in 1994
Moths of South America